Cosmotomidius is a genus of longhorn beetles of the subfamily Lamiinae, containing the following species:

Species
 Cosmotomidius cacaoensis Touroult & al., 2010
 Cosmotomidius crudiaphilus Touroult & al., 2010
 Cosmotomidius egregius (Martins & Galileo, 2007)
 Cosmotomidius elongatus Touroult & al., 2010
 Cosmotomidius morvanae Touroult & al., 2010
 Cosmotomidius nigrisetosus Touroult & al., 2010
 Cosmotomidius setosus (Audinet-Serville, 1835)
 Cosmotomidius vincus Machado & Monné, 2009

References

Acanthoderini
Cerambycidae genera